San Pietro in Gu is a comune (municipality) in the Province of Padua in the Italian region Veneto, located about  northwest of Venice and about  northwest of Padua.

San Pietro in Gu borders the following municipalities: Bolzano Vicentino, Bressanvido, Carmignano di Brenta, Gazzo, Grantorto, Pozzoleone, Quinto Vicentino.

References

External links
 Official website

Cities and towns in Veneto